The Tsawwassen First Nation is a First Nations government whose lands are located in the Greater Vancouver area of the Lower Mainland of British Columbia, Canada, close to the South Arm of the Fraser River and just north of the international boundary with the United States at Point Roberts, Washington. Tsawwassen First Nation lists its membership at 491 people, nearly half of whom live on the lands.

Overview 
Like most First Nations people of the West Coast, the Tsawwassen lived in family groups and inhabited longhouses. They carved no totem poles but ornate house posts, masks, tools with carvings etc. Also they processed cedar fibers and goat hair into dresses and headgear. Also, the wooden building material, firewood, canoes and dresses. Using tidal traps, fishing, nets and harpoons they hunted fish, especially salmon. They also harvested oysters, crabs and other sea creatures. The salmon was considered a supernatural being, and therefore had to be hunted and eaten in a very particular way. The remains were returned to the sea in a private ceremony. Numerous species of birds were on the menu, such as ducks, loons, to seals and sea lions. Land mammals such as moose, deer, black bear and beaver were hunted seasonally. Also Camassia, cranberries and medicinal plants were harvested, also traded and exchanged.

The traditional Tsawwassen area ranged in the north east to the area around Pitt Lake, Pitt River to Pitt Meadows down to where the water in the Fraser River flows. It included Burns Bog and parts of New Westminster. From Sea Island to Galiano Island and joined Salt Spring, Pender and Saturna Island. North Eastwards came the Point Roberts peninsula added, then the area around the Serpentine and Nicomekl River.

Today, their territory has been reduced to a relatively small semi-enclave of Delta by the shore, between the Tsawwassen ferry terminal and the Roberts Bank Superport. They also own some lands by Boundary Bay and the Fraser River, but jurisdiction remains with the city of Delta.

Tsawwassen means "land facing the sea". The nearby neighbourhood of Tsawwassen and the Tsawwassen ferry terminal take their names from the First Nation.

History
The oldest finds in the area of Tsawwassen First Nation settled by means of radiocarbon dated to about 2260 BC. Other sites such as Whalen Farm and Beach Grove dating back to the presence of Tsawwassen at least until the time of 400–200 BC.

Reserves, loss of land 
In 1851, the last frontier settlements in the wake of the border treaty of 1846 between the United States and Great Britain took place. A portion of the Tsawwassen Territory was now in Point Roberts in the U.S. state of Washington. In 1858 the first cross-country road was built in British Columbia from Tsawwassen Beach to Fort Langley. In 1859, it was followed by the first inner-city street the "North Road" between Burnaby and Coquitlam. In 1914, chief Harry Joe sent a petition to the McKenna McBride Commission, with a request for review of reservations. The petition was dismissed. Nevertheless, young Tsawwassen First Nation people joined the Canadian Military in the First and Second World Wars.

In 1958, the provincial government built the BC Ferries terminal in Tsawwassen for their ferries. For this purpose, a Tsawwassen First Nation long house was demolished. When the terminal was enlarged in 1973, 1976, and 1991, there were no consultations with the Tsawwassen peoples.  
 
The Tsawwassen First Nation is a member government of the Naut'sa mawt Tribal Council.

Treaty and land claims negotiations 
The Tsawwassen, a Coast Salish people, are one of the few British Columbia First Nations to come to the end of the British Columbia Treaty Process, the others being the Tla'amin Nation, the member nations of the Maa-nulth First Nations (consisting of the Huu-ay-aht First Nations, Kyuquot/Cheklesahht First Nation, Toquaht First Nation, Uchucklesaht First Nation, and Ucluelet First Nation). The Nisga'a also have self-government, but completed prior to the establishment of the formal BC Treaty Process. The Yale First Nation's final agreement is ratified, but has not come into effect yet.  The treaty deal would have allowed for the expansion of the Roberts Bank Superport and the employment of band members in the expanded facility, but was criticized by some as a sell-out, as the negotiated settlement modified and defined TFN's Aboriginal rights. The Treaty was ratified by Tsawwassen members in July 2007 and expanded the size of the Tsawwassen reserve by 400 hectares, offered a cash settlement of $16 million and $36 million in program funding, re-established TFN's right to self-govern, and reserved a portion of the Fraser River salmon catch to the Tsawwassen. In return, the Tsawwassen would abandon other land claims and would eventually pay taxes. On April 3, 2009, after 14 years of negotiations, the Tsawwassen First Nation implemented the Final Agreement and became self-governing. In 2009, the first election of the new Legislature was called as the existing Indian Act was replaced. Tsawwassen First Nation then also became the first First Nation to become a full member of the Metro Vancouver Regional District.

In January 2012, a "mega-mall" project was approved by the Tsawwassen First Nation, with 43 percent of the eligible voters taking part. Of that 43 percent who voted, 97 percent were in favor of the project. The mall is expected to create jobs and stimulate tourism for the community. The resulting Tsawwassen Mills mall, built by Ivanhoé Cambridge, opened on October 5, 2016.

See also
Indigenous peoples of the Pacific Northwest Coast
Musqueam First Nation
Kwantlen First Nation
Lummi
Semiahmoo First Nation
Halkomelem (language)
North Straits Salish 
Sto:lo

References

External links
Tsawwassen First Nation website

Coast Salish governments
First Nations governments in the Lower Mainland